{{Infobox religious biography
| religion           = Islam
| occupation         = Mufassir, Islamic cleric, Teacher, and Lecturer
| main_interests     = Hadith and Tafsir
| notable_ideas      = 
| notable_works      = 
| alma_mater         = Islamic University of Madinah, Saudi Arabia.
| teachers           = 
| denomination       = Sunni
| Sufi_order         = 
| expand_students    = 
| disciple_of        = 
| disciples          = 
| influences         = 
| expand_influences  = 
| influenced         = 
| jurisprudence      = 
| movement           = Sunni (Salafi)
| students           = 
| region             = Northern Nigeria
| death_date         = 
| image              = Professor Muhammad Sani Umar Rijiyar Lemo.jpg
| alt                = 
| caption            = 
| title              = 
| birth_name         = 
| birth_place        = Mecca, Saudi Arabia
| birth_date         = 
| honorific_prefix   = Sheikh
| death_place        = 
| death_cause        = 
| resting_place      = 
| nationality        = Nigerian
| ethnicity          = Hausa
| era                = Modern era
| name               = Muhammad Sani Umar Rijiyar Lemo, 
| expand_influenced  = 
| website            = https://sheikhsaniumar.com
}}Muhammad Sani Umar Rijiyar Lemo', (born July 1, 1970) is an Islamic scholar in Nigeria with expertise in Hadith and Tafsir''.

Education 
He is a lecturer at Bayero University Kano. Sani Umar studied Hadith sciences at the Islamic University of Madinah in Saudi Arabia from undergraduate to postgraduate level.

See also 

 Ahmad Abubakar Gumi
 Kabiru Gombe

References

Sunni Muslims
Nigerian Salafis
1970 births
Nigerian scholars
Living people
People from  Mecca
Islamic University of Madinah alumni
Hausa people